Chantal Janzen (born 15 February 1979) is a Dutch actress, singer and TV presenter. She had parts in The Preacher, Full Moon Party and Deuce Bigalow: European Gigolo and presented Idols.

She also played Belle in the Dutch musical production of Beauty and the Beast (noted for being the first Belle with blonde hair) and Jane in Tarzan. From late 2011 to mid 2012, she starred as Glinda in the musical Wicked. She also sang a song against cancer, called "Vecht Mee" (English: Fight With Us) with Dutch rapper Yes-R. Internationally, she's best known for co-hosting Eurovision: Europe Shine a Light and the Eurovision Song Contest 2021.

Life and career 

Janzen was born in Tegelen. She studied at the Amsterdamse Hogeschool voor de Kunsten. She was taught in classical, modern, jazz and tapdance, acting, singing and musical repertoire.

She played several guest roles in TV shows like Baantjer, Intensive Care, De Band, Meiden van De Wit and Kinderen Geen Bezwaar. She also hosted Staatsloterij Live and the Dutch version of Idols. Janzen played several parts in movies: De Dominee, Feestje, Deuce Bigalow: European Gigolo, Volle Maan, Alles is Liefde, Kicks and the made-for-TV film Loverboy. In December 2002 her single "Achter De Sterren", the title song from the movie Science Fiction was released.

She also won a musical award in 2005 for Best actress in a supporting role for the musical Crazy For You. She got nominated for Best female lead in 2006 as Belle in Beauty and the Beast and in 2007 she got nominated for the same prize for her role as Jane in the musical Tarzan. Because of her pregnancy she had to temporarily leave her part in the musical Tarzan from September 2008 through April 2009. She was replaced by Bente van den Brand. After Tarzan she played a part in the Disney Musical Sing-Along. In 2010 Janzen can be seen in the musical Petticoat. It's an original Dutch musical, written especially for her. After her role in Petticoat she played the role of Glinda in the Dutch rendition of the Broadway musical Wicked.

In 2011 Janzen ended her contract with the Dutch TV channel AVRO and signed a contract with RTL. According to her, hosting the Award shows she had been hosting at the AVRO for the fourth year in a row, would make her performance look cheap. She was enthused by the idea of experiencing other things. In 2012 Janzen had roles in the series Divorce and Goede tijden, slechte tijden. Later on in 2019 Janzen returned in another small role in Goede tijden, slechte tijden.

Since she made the switch to RTL Nederland, she has presented various television programs including De Jongens tegen de Meisjes, Everybody Dance Now, It Takes 2, Time To Dance and The Voice of Holland. She also presents the Dutch versions of Dance Dance Dance, All Together Now and Dancing with the Stars. Over the years Janzen was also seen as a jury member in the television shows Your Face Sounds Familliar, Holland's Got Talent and The Talent Project. In 2015 and 2016, Janzen could also be seen as a presenter in Germany at The Voice Kids and as jury member at Superkids.

In 2019, Janzen was one of the members of the "Wall of the World" in the American television show The World's Best. On 4 December 2019, she was announced as one of the three presenters of the Eurovision Song Contest 2020 in Rotterdam alongside Edsilia Rombley and Jan Smit; the contest itself would be cancelled in March 2020 as a result of the COVID-19 pandemic and was replaced with Eurovision: Europe Shine a Light (which was presented jointly by Janzen, Rombley, and Smit), which was held on 16 May 2020. She went on to host the Eurovision Song Contest 2021.
In November 2020, Janzen was announced as the host of the game show Beat the Champions.

Filmography

Film

Television 
As an actress

As a presenter / jury member

Musicals

Personal life 
Janzen is in a relationship with Marco Geeratz. She gave birth to their first son, James, on 23 January 2009. On 15 December 2014, they were married in London. Geeratz has three children from a prior relationship. On 30 March 2018, the couple had their second son, Bobby.

References

External links

1979 births
Living people
Dutch film actresses
Dutch stage actresses
Dutch television personalities
Dutch television actresses
People from Tegelen
Dutch musical theatre actresses
Dutch women singers
21st-century Dutch actresses